Club Brugge KV is a football club based in Bruges in Belgium. It was founded in 1891 and is one of the top clubs in Belgium.

Seasons

List of Club Brugge KV seasonpages 

 2003–04 Club Brugge KV season
 2006–07 Club Brugge KV season
 2013–14 Club Brugge KV season
 2014–15 Club Brugge KV season
 2015–16 Club Brugge KV season
 2017–18 Club Brugge KV season
 2018–19 Club Brugge KV season
 2019–20 Club Brugge KV season
 2020–21 Club Brugge KV season
 2021–22 Club Brugge KV season
 2022–23 Club Brugge KV season

External links 

 Official website

Club Brugge KV
Club Brugge KV seasons
Belgian football club seasons